Den Ham is a hamlet in the Dutch province of Groningen. It is located in the municipality of Westerwolde, close to the border with Germany, between Bellingwolde and Nieuweschans.

References

External links 

Populated places in Groningen (province)
Westerwolde (municipality)